Roneam Daun Sam Wildlife Sanctuary was a protected area located in western Cambodia, created in 1993 by Royal Decree, originally covering 178,750 hectares, reduced to 39,961 hectares following several PADDD events. The sanctuary was dissolved in February 2018 by a royal decree. Sao Sopheap, then-spokesman for the Ministry of Environment said “Families of soldiers under the Khmer Rouge went to occupy areas of the Roneam Daun Sam Wildlife Sanctuary, and later during integration in 1998, the government decided to give people the land that they were occupying, and continuously provided land titles to them. So, those areas have lost function or are no longer used as wildlife sanctuaries.”

References

External 

 Map of Protected areas system in Cambodia

Wildlife sanctuaries of Cambodia
Protected areas of Cambodia
Protected areas established in 1993